The 1948–49 Arkansas Razorbacks men's basketball team represented the University of Arkansas in the 1948–49 college basketball season. The Razorbacks played their home games in the Men's Gymnasium in Fayetteville, Arkansas. It was former Razorback All-American Eugene Lambert's seventh and final season as head coach of the Hogs. Arkansas received its first-ever rating in the new AP Poll (which was first published on January 18, 1949) on February 28, 1949, coming in at #20.

Arkansas received a bid to the NCAA tournament, its third appearance in the tournament overall and second with Lambert as coach after advancing to the 1945 Final Four and not being able to participate during the 1943–44 season due to a serious car crash that killed a staff member, Everett Norris, and injured two starters, Deno Nichols and Ben Jones.

Guard Kenneth Kearns was named First Team All-SWC for the season, going on to be drafted by the New York Knicks in the 1949 BAA Draft.

Coach Eugene Lambert moved on after the end of the season, entering sports administration before coaching stints at Memphis State and Alabama, eventually settling as the athletic director at Memphis State.

Roster
Roster retrieved from HogStats.com.

Schedule and results
Schedule retrieved from HogStats.com.

|-
!colspan=12 style=|Regular season

|-
!colspan=12 style=| NCAA District 6 Playoffs

|-
!colspan=12 style=|  NCAA Tournament

References

Arkansas Razorbacks
Arkansas Razorbacks men's basketball seasons
Arkansas